A parish church in the Church of England is the church which acts as the religious centre for the people within each Church of England parish (the smallest and most basic Church of England administrative unit; since the 19th century sometimes called the ecclesiastical parish, to avoid confusion with the civil parish which many towns and villages have).

Parishes in England

In England, there are parish churches for both the Church of England and the Roman Catholic Church. References to a "parish church", without mention of a denomination, will, however, usually be to those of the Church of England due to its status as the Established Church. This is generally true also for Wales, although the Church in Wales is dis-established.

The Church of England is made up of parishes, each one forming part of a diocese. Almost every part of England is within both a parish and a diocese (there are very few non-parochial areas and some parishes not in dioceses). These ecclesiastical parishes are often no longer the same as the civil parishes in local government. Larger towns and cities, even those with cathedrals, still have ecclesiastical parishes and parish churches.

Each parish is ministered to by a parish priest, usually called a vicar, rector or priest-in-charge. More rarely the parish priest is known as a "perpetual curate". In one instance only the priest is also, by historical custom, officially known as an "archpriest". Each parish usually has one active parish church, though rarely and historically more than one; if there is no parish church, the bishop will usually license another building and may designate it as a Parish Centre of Worship. A parish may also be served by a number of chapels of ease. Unused 'redundant' parish churches may exist in parishes formed by the merging of two or more parishes, or because of the cost of upkeep. These redundant churches may survive as ruins, remain empty, or be converted for alternative uses.

Character
Church of England parish churches include some of the oldest churches to be found in England, often built before the 16th-century reformation, and thus predating the division of Western Christianity. A number are substantially of Anglo-Saxon date, and all subsequent periods of architecture are represented in the country. Most parishes have churches that date back to the Middle Ages, though often with many later additions or alterations. The parish churches of the City of London are particularly famous for their Baroque architecture. Each building reflects its status and there is considerable variety in the size and style of parish churches. Some very large former monastic or collegiate churches are now parish churches, not always in their complete original form. As well as their architecture, many Church of England parish churches are known for their interesting and beautiful church fittings which are often remarkable survivals. These may include monuments, hatchments, wall paintings, stained glass, floor tiles, carved pews, choir stalls (perhaps with misericords), lecterns and fonts, sometimes even shrines or vestments.

The Church of England parish church was always fundamental to the life of every community, especially in rural areas. However, by the late 20th and early 21st centuries, with the decline in the number of worshippers and the shortage of Anglican priests, there has been a trend towards team or shared ministries, and many parish churches no longer have a service every Sunday.

Notable parish churches

This is a very incomplete list of notable Church of England parish churches:

See also

Churches Conservation Trust
Historical development of Church of England dioceses
Architecture of the medieval cathedrals of England
Stained glass - British glass, 1811-1918
Greater Churches Group

References

External links
The Ground Plan of the English Parish Church by A. Hamilton Thompson
Church of England website
Find a Church in the Church of England ("A Church Near You")
Historical resources on the Church of England

 
Types of Christian organization
Types of church buildings